The Lotus Tournament was a professional golf tournament played in England. It was held annually from 1946 to 1952. Total prize money was £1500.

Winners

References

Golf tournaments in England
Recurring sporting events established in 1946
Recurring sporting events disestablished in 1952
1946 establishments in England
1952 disestablishments in England